is an amateur Japanese Greco-Roman wrestler, who competes in the men's welterweight category. He won a bronze medal in his weight category at the 2010 Asian Games in Guangzhou, China. Fujimura is a member of the wrestling team for The Self-Defence Forces of Japan, under his personal coach Masaki Iimuro, and also, an economics graduate at Tokuyama University.

Fujimura represented Japan at the 2012 Summer Olympics in London, where he competed for the men's 66 kg class. He received a bye for the preliminary round of sixteen match, before losing out to U.S. wrestler Justin Lester, who was able to score three points each in two straight periods, leaving Fujimura with only a single point.

References

External links
Profile – International Wrestling Database
NBC Olympics Profile

1982 births
Living people
Tokuyama University alumni
Olympic wrestlers of Japan
Wrestlers at the 2012 Summer Olympics
Wrestlers at the 2010 Asian Games
Asian Games medalists in wrestling
People from Yamaguchi Prefecture
Wrestlers at the 2014 Asian Games
Japanese male sport wrestlers
Asian Games bronze medalists for Japan
Medalists at the 2010 Asian Games
20th-century Japanese people
21st-century Japanese people